Mechthild Bach is a German soprano and a professor at the Hochschule für Musik Trossingen.

Biography and career
Bach was born in Limburg an der Lahn, where she was a member of the Limburg Cathedral's girl choir from a very young age. After her abitur, she began her studies at the Hochschule für Musik und Darstellende Kunst Frankfurt am Main, under Elsa Cavelti's tutelage. During her time there she also made her operatic debut at the Staatstheater Darmstadt.

Since then, Bach has performed in such opera houses such as the Deutsche Oper am Rhein, the Nationaltheater München, and the Theater der Stadt Heidelberg, with conductors Reinhard Goebel, Peter Neumann, Ton Koopman, and Helmuth Rilling, among others. Additionally, she has performed the soprano parts in Mahler's symphonies, as Antigona in Handel's Admeto, and as Alice Ford in Verdi's Falstaff. She has also performed with the Internationale Bachakademie Stuttgart, the Royal Concertgebouw Orchestra, and the Berlin Philharmonic.

Awards 
 1986: A grant from the Studienstiftung des Deutschen Volkes
 1993: Innsbrucker Radiopreis für Alte Musik, for her album Thomaskantoren vor Bach with Cantus Cölln
 2002: Preis der deutschen Schallplattenkritik, for her recording of Zelenka's Missa Dei Patris, with Frieder Bernius

References

External links
 Official Website
 Profile on Bach Cantatas Website

21st-century German women opera singers
German operatic sopranos
Frankfurt University of Music and Performing Arts alumni
Studienstiftung alumni
Living people
1949 births